Built may refer to:

 Built (TV series), an American reality television series that aired on the Style Network
Built: the hidden stories behind our structures, 2018 book by Roma Agrawal
 Building

Built different definition- Levi on PC

See also
 
 
 Built environment, man-made surroundings for human activity
 Built-in (disambiguation)
 Built to Last, 1989 Grateful Dead album
 Built to Spill, indie rock band
 Built-up area, urban development
 Built-up edge, in metalworking
 Built-up gun, construction technique for artillery barrels
 Indie Built, defunct computer game developer
 Stick-built, home constructed entirely or largely on-site